King Arthur Was a Gentleman is a 1942 British, black-and-white, comedy, musical film, directed by Marcel Varnel and starring Arthur Askey. It was produced by Edward Black and Maurice Ostrer for Gainsborough Pictures.

Synopsis
Set during World War II, the plot involves the undersized Arthur joining the army to prove himself to his girlfriend Susan (Evelyn Dall), who is in the same unit as him. Here, his idealistic notions about King Arthur prompt his messmates to trick him into believing that a sword they have dug up is the fabled Excalibur. Armed with this talisman Arthur strides forth to deal with the Wehrmacht.

Cast
 Arthur Askey as Arthur King
 Max Bacon as Maxie
 Al Burnett as Slim
 Evelyn Dall as Susan Ashley
 Vera Frances as Vera
 Peter Graves as Lance
 Brefni O'Rorke as Colonel Duncannon
 Anne Shelton as Gwen Duncannon
 Ronald Shiner as Sergeant
 Jack Train as Jack
 Victor Feldman as young drummer with Maxie
 Freddie Crump as himself, drumming

Soundtrack
 Arthur Askey - "You Know What King Arthur Said"
 Arthur Askey - "Honey On My Mind"
 Anne Shelton - "Why Can't It Happen To Me?"
 Evelyn Dall - "You'll Love The Army"
 Evelyn Dall - "Got A Bee In My Bonnet"
 Evelyn Dall - "Actions Speak Louder Than Words"

References

External links
 
 
 

1942 films
1942 musical comedy films
Arthurian films
British black-and-white films
British musical comedy films
British World War II propaganda films
1940s English-language films
Films directed by Marcel Varnel
Films produced by Maurice Ostrer
Gainsborough Pictures films
Films with screenplays by Marriott Edgar